Penns Park Historic District is a national historic district located in Wrightstown Township, Bucks County, Pennsylvania.  The district includes 34 contributing buildings in the village of Phillips Mill.  The district largely developed in the 19th century and is characterized by 2 1/2-story, gable roofed residences in vernacular interpretations of a variety of popular architectural styles including Greek Revival, Gothic, and Queen Anne. A number of the residences have been converted to commercial purposes. Notable buildings include the Methodist church, Penns Park School, and Penns Park Tavern.

It was added to the National Register of Historic Places in 1986.

References

External links

Historic districts in Bucks County, Pennsylvania
Greek Revival houses in Pennsylvania
Gothic Revival church buildings in Pennsylvania
Queen Anne architecture in Pennsylvania
Historic American Buildings Survey in Pennsylvania
Octagonal school buildings in the United States
Historic districts on the National Register of Historic Places in Pennsylvania
National Register of Historic Places in Bucks County, Pennsylvania